The 1995 Ontario general election was held on June 8, 1995, to elect members of the 36th Legislative Assembly of the province of Ontario, Canada. The writs for the election were dropped on April 28, 1995.

The governing New Democratic Party, led by Premier Bob Rae, was defeated by voters, who were angry with the actions of the Rae government, such as its unpopular hiring quotas and the Social Contract legislation in 1993. These policies caused the NDP to lose much of its base in organized labour, further reducing support for the party. At the 1993 federal election, the NDP tumbled to less than seven percent support, and lost all 11 of its federal seats in Ontario. By the time the writs were dropped for the 1995 provincial election, it was obvious that the NDP would not be reelected.

Campaign 
The Liberal Party under Lyn McLeod had been leading in the polls for most of the period from 1992 to 1995, and were generally favoured to benefit from the swing in support away from the NDP. However, the party hurt its credibility through a series of high-profile policy reversals in the period leading up to the election.  The most notable of these occurred when McLeod withdrew Liberal support from the Equality Rights Statute Amendment Act (Bill 167) introduced by the NDP government in 1994, which would have provided same-sex couples with rights and obligations mostly equal to those of opposite-sex common law couples and introduced a form of civil unions. Her decision was seen as cynical and opportunistic in light of the Liberals' earlier rural by-election loss in the socially conservative riding of Victoria—Haliburton. This gave the McLeod Liberals a reputation for "flip-flopping" and inconsistency while offending its socially progressive supporters.

The Progressive Conservative Party, led by Mike Harris, found success with its Common Sense Revolution campaign to cut personal income taxes, social assistance (welfare) rates, and government spending dramatically. Roughly half of his party's seats came from the more affluent regions of the Greater Toronto Area (GTA), especially the suburban belt surrounding Metro Toronto, often called the '905' for its telephone area code.

In addition, by presenting himself as a populist, representing "ordinary Ontarians" over "special interests", Harris was able to build Tory support among working-class voters. Although there were regional variations, many working-class voters shifted directly from the NDP to the Tories during the election, enabling the latter to win formerly NDP ridings such as Cambridge and Oshawa.

The televised party leaders' debate is often regarded as the turning point of the campaign. During the event, McLeod further alienated many voters with an overly aggressive performance. Harris used his time to speak directly to the camera to convey his party's Common Sense Revolution platform, virtually ignoring all questions asked of him by Rae and McLeod and avoiding getting caught up in their debate. Since Liberal support was regarded by many political insiders as soft and unsteady, many voters who were previously leaning to the Liberals shifted to the Progressive Conservatives after the debate.

Results 
The Progressive Conservatives won a majority while the Liberals finished with less support than they had in the 1990 election. The NDP, despite improving their standing in some Northern Ontario ridings, were heavily defeated, falling to 17 seats and third party status. The New Democrats would remain the third party until 2018 when they returned to Official Opposition status. McLeod and Rae resigned their party leadership posts not long after the campaign. It was also the worst result for an incumbent Ontario governing party up to that time and would remain so until 2018 when the NDP finally surpassed the then-governing Liberals.

One independent candidate was elected: Peter North in the riding of Elgin. North had been elected in 1990 as a New Democrat, but left the NDP and declared his intention to run as a Progressive Conservative. The PC Party did not accept him as a candidate, however.

Notes:

At least five unregistered parties fielded candidates in this election.

The Reform Association of Ontario ran fifteen candidates.  Their leader was Kimble Ainslie. An article of The Globe and Mail for August 19, 1995 indicates that the party won 6,400 votes.
John Steele campaigned as a candidate of the Communist League.
The Ontario Renewal Party ran a number of candidates under the leadership of Diane Johnston.  This was the Marxist–Leninist party under a different name.
Amani Oakley and Joe Flexer ran as "Independent Labour" candidates in Toronto with the support of dissident or former members of the Ontario New Democratic Party and with the support of OPSEU in the case of Oakley and the Canadian Auto Workers in the case of Flexer .
 John Turmel's Abolitionist Party ran at least two candidates.

Candidates from the aforementioned parties appeared on the ballot as independents.  It is possible that some candidates listed below as independents actually belonged to these or other parties.

Riding results

Ottawa-Carleton

|-
| style="background:whitesmoke;"|Carleton 
|
|Cathy Hallessey4,046    
| 
|Sam Spataro9,743
||
|Norm Sterling28,349
|
|
|
|Richard Beecroft265
|
|Janne Jardine-Campbell (FCP)942Barbara Rowe (Lbt)293
||
|Norm Sterling
|-
| style="background:whitesmoke;"|Carleton East
|
|Fiona Faucher4,783
||
|Gilles Morin17,780
|
|Jeff Slater13,571
|
|
|
|Ian Campbell 758
|
|
||
|Gilles Morin
|-
| style="background:whitesmoke;"|Nepean
|
|John Sullivan3,274
|
|Hans Daigeler13,575
||
|John Baird17,510
|
|Frank de Jong 390
|
|Brian Jackson 259
|
|Cathy Frampton (F)252
||
|Hans Daigeler
|-
| style="background:whitesmoke;"|Ottawa Centre
|
|Evelyn Gigantes9,438
||
|Richard Patten 11,150
|
|Chris Thomson6,715
|
|Andrew Van Iterson 349
|
|Ron Parker 365
|
|Malek Khouri (Comm)210John Turmel (Abol.)173
||
|Evelyn Gigantes
|-
| style="background:whitesmoke;"|
Ottawa East
|
|David Dyment4,818
||
|Bernard Grandmaitre14,436
|
|Cynthia Bled5,368
|
|Larry Tyldsley 335
|
|Robert Mayer 261
|
|Steven White (Abol.)136
||
|Bernard Grandmaitre 
|-
| style="background:whitesmoke;"|Ottawa–Rideau 
|
|Dan McIntyre4,138
|
|Yvonne O'Neill13,273
||
|Garry Guzzo14,796
|
|Lenora Burke 412
|
|Richard Wolfson 178
|
|
||
|Yvonne O'Neill 
|-
| style="background:whitesmoke;"|Ottawa South
|
|Margaret Armstrong4,235
||
|Dalton McGuinty15,418
|
|Linda Thom8,618
|
|Karen Fyson 383
|
|Wayne Foster 245
|
|
||
|Dalton McGuinty
|-
| style="background:whitesmoke;"|Ottawa West
|
|Karim Ismaili3,718
||
|Bob Chiarelli14,516
|
|Greg Joy12,898
|
|Stephen Johns 448
|
|Stan Lamothe 96
|
|Andy Sammon (Ind)241
||
|Bob Chiarelli
|}

Eastern Ontario

|-
| style="background:whitesmoke;"|Cornwall 
|
|Syd Gardiner1,719  
|| 
|John Cleary14,507
|
|Keith Clingen7,838
|
|Bernise Featherstone 236
|
|
||
|John Cleary
|- 
| style="background:whitesmoke;"|Frontenac—Addington
|
|Fred Wilson7,302
|
|Peter Walker10,249
||
|Bill Vankoughnet12,211
|
|William Overall 121
|
|Laurie Greenidge (FCP)1404Ross Baker (Ind)416
||
|Fred Wilson
|-
| style="background:whitesmoke;"|Hastings—Peterborough
|
|Elmer Buchanan8,328
|
|Barb Jinkerson4,056
||
|Harry Danford16,187
|
|David Hetherington 308
|
|John Westen (FCP)1,002
||
|Elmer Buchanan
|-
| style="background:whitesmoke;"|Kingston and the Islands
|
|Gary Wilson8,052
||
|John Gerretsen10,314
|
|Sally Barnes8,571
|
|Ronald Dunphy 155
|
|John Pacheco (FCP)858
||
|Gary Wilson
|-
| style="background:whitesmoke;"|Lanark-Renfrew
|
|Don Page3,455
|
|June Timmons9,956
||
|Leo Jordan19,959
|
|Rick Alexander 237
|
|Murray Reid (CoR)867Kilian O'Donovan (FCP)745Mike Dubroy (Ind)557
||
|Leo Jordan
|-
| style="background:whitesmoke;"|Leeds–Grenville
|
|Charles Stewart2,316
|
|Peter McKenna8,955
||
|Bob Runciman21,763
|
|
|
|Peter Bevan-Baker (G)927Phillip Blancher (Ind)438
||
|Bob Runciman
|-
| style="background:whitesmoke;"|Prescott and Russell
|
|Yves Deschamps4,472
||
|Jean-Marc Lalonde24,808
|
|Pierre Leduc13,637
|
|Pierrette Blondin 446
|
|Jean-Serge Brisson (Lbt)626John MacKinnon (Ind)564
||
|Jean Poirier
|-
| style="background:whitesmoke;"|Prince Edward—Lennox
|
|Paul Johnson5,996
|
|Robert Gentile7,798
||
|Gary Fox14,144
|
|
|
|Kenn Hineman (CoR)571
||
|Paul Johnson
|-
| style="background:whitesmoke;"|Quinte
|
|Barb Dolan3,743
|
|George Zegouras11,826
||
|Doug Rollins13,961
|
|
|
|
||
|Hugh O'Neil
|-
| style="background:whitesmoke;"|Renfrew North
|
|Ish Theilheimer2,483
||
|Sean Conway16,044
|
|Dan Callaghan9,681
|
|Andre Giardano 187
|
|Stan Callaghan (FCP)1,695
||
|Sean Conway
|-
| style="background:whitesmoke;"|Stormont—Dundas—Glengarry and East Grenville
|
|Michael Cowley-Owen2,285
|
|Denis Sabourin7,594
||
|Noble Villeneuve18,884
|
|Andrew Featherstone 428
|
|
||
|Noble Villeneuve
|}

Central Ontario

|-
| style="background:whitesmoke;"|Bruce
|
|Robert Emerson4,269     
|
|Bruce Lauckner11,004
|| 
|Barb Fisher13,680
|
|John Clark 2,787
|
|Catherine Young (G)296
||
|Vacant
|-
| style="background:whitesmoke;"|Dufferin—Peel  
|
|Sandra Crane3,470   
| 
|Mavis Wilson8,501
||
|David Tilson23,239
|
|
|
|
||
|David Tilson
|-
| style="background:whitesmoke;"|Grey—Owen Sound   
|
|Greg Cooper3,413  
| 
|Everett Hall8,262
||
|Bill Murdoch25,138
|
|David Black 2,082
|
|Michael Schmidt (Ind)703Ian Roberts (NLP)170
||
|Bill Murdoch
|-
| style="background:whitesmoke;"|Muskoka–Georgian Bay
|
|Dan Waters7,742     
| 
|Ken Black8,095
||
|Bill Grimmett17,864
|
|
|
|Michael Fenton (G)411Bill Ogilvie (Ind)381
||
|Dan Waters
|-
| style="background:whitesmoke;"|Northumberland  
|
|Murray Weppler4,539   
|
|Joan Fawcett13,233
|| 
|Doug Galt19,359
|
|
|
|
||
|Joan Fawcett
|-
| style="background:whitesmoke;"|Peterborough   
|
|Jenny Carter7,581  
| 
|Sylvia Sutherland10,326
||
|Gary Stewart22,735
|
|Paul Morgan 2,064
|
|Vic Watts (Lbt)251Peter Leggat (NLP)213
||
|Jenny Carter
|-
| style="background:whitesmoke;"|Simcoe Centre 
|
|Paul Wessenger7,655    
| 
|Bruce Owen12,061
||
|Joe Tascona29,790
|
|Susane MacPhee-Manning 769
|
|Richard Warman (G)580Les Barnett (Ind)284
||
|Paul Wessenger
|-
| style="background:whitesmoke;"|Simcoe East
|
|Marg Ducie4,849
| 
|Ralph Cipolla9,044
||
|Al McLean23,489
|
|
|
|Allan MacDonald (Ind)876Siggy Lamothe (NLP)266
||
|Al McLean
|-
| style="background:whitesmoke;"|Simcoe West 
|
|Kathy Simpson4,937    
| 
|Jamie Shortt5,499
||
|Jim Wilson24,346
|
|James Gault 894
|
|
||
|Jim Wilson
|-
| style="background:whitesmoke;"|Victoria—Haliburton   
|
|Cathy Vainio4,210  
| 
|Sharon McCrae6,280
||
|Chris Hodgson25,267
|
|James Medd 378
|
|Brad Bradamore (Ind)643Charles Olito (CoR)51
||
|Chris Hodgson
|}

Durham and York Region

|-
| style="background:whitesmoke;"|Durham Centre   
|
|Drummond White8,120  
|
|Allan Furlong9,808
|| 
|Jim Flaherty25,107
|
|
||
|Drummond White
|-
| style="background:whitesmoke;"|Durham East    
|
|Gord Mills8,519 
|
|Mary Novak6,512
|| 
|John O'Toole24,303
|
|
||
|Gord Mills
|-
| style="background:whitesmoke;"|Durham West  
|
|Jim Wiseman9,444   
|
|Joe Dickson13,974
|| 
|Janet Ecker29,232
|
|Neil Fonseka (Ind)904
||
|Jim Wiseman
|-
| style="background:whitesmoke;"|Durham—York
|
|Larry O'Connor8,048     
|
|David Marquis7,512
|| 
|Julia Munro25,018
|
|Vincent Artymko (FCP)845
||
|Larry O'Connor
|-
| style="background:whitesmoke;"|Markham
| 
|Mike Tang7,779     
|
|Khalid Usman10,770
||
|David Tsubouchi37,314
|
|Pat Redmond (FCP)1,088Stephen Porter (NLP)626
||
|Vacant
|-
| style="background:whitesmoke;"|Oshawa 
|
|Allan Pilkey8,450    
|
|Linda Porritt5,666
||
|Jerry Ouellette16,793
|
|
||
|Allan Pilkey
|-
| style="background:whitesmoke;"|York Centre 
| 
|Joseph Thevarkunnel6,698    
|
|Mario Ferri29,150
||
|Al Palladini37,897
|
|
||
|Greg Sorbara
|-
| style="background:whitesmoke;"|York—Mackenzie
| 
|Susan Wakeling3,611     
|
|Charles Beer13,973
||
|Frank Klees25,904
|
|Stefan Slovak (FCP)498Christopher Ball (G)425
||
|Charles Beer
|}

Scarborough

|-
| style="background:whitesmoke;"|Scarborough—Agincourt    
| 
|Christine Fei4,112 
||
|Gerry Phillips13,472
|
|Keith MacNab11,337
|
|Daphne Quance 313
|
|
||
|Gerry Phillips
|-
| style="background:whitesmoke;"|Scarborough Centre  
|
|Steve Owens6,841   
|
|Mary Ellen Pimblett7,163
||
|Dan Newman12,717
|
|Eleanor Hyodo 349
|
|John Brereton (Ind)649
||
|Steve Owens
|-
| style="background:whitesmoke;"|Scarborough East     
|
|Bob Frankford7,212
|
|Bhagat Taggar7,197
||
|Steve Gilchrist19,166
|
|Jim Hill 234
|
|Sam Apelbaum (Lbt)319Neville Berry (Ind)270
||
|Bob Frankford
|-
| style="background:whitesmoke;"|Scarborough—Ellesmere
|
|David Warner7,906     
|
|Kris Parthiban5,602 	
||
|Marilyn Mushinski13,282
|
|Daniele Belair 202
|
|James MacLeod (CoR)745
||
|David Warner
|-
| style="background:whitesmoke;"|Scarborough North
|
|Tarek Fatah6,431     
||
|Alvin Curling15,507
|
|Mike Thomas10,508
|
|Fred Fredeen 239
|
|Paul Blair (F)601Rina Morra (FCP)369
||
|Alvin Curling
|-
| style="background:whitesmoke;"|Scarborough West 
|
|Anne Swarbrick9,216    
|
|John Marchildon5,326
||
|Jim Brown11,773
|
|Cynthia Marchand 387
|
|Frank Meyers (Ref)254George Dance (Lbt)214Eric Stark (G)129
||
|Anne Swarbrick
|}

North York and East York

|-
| style="background:whitesmoke;"|Don Mills
|
|Janaki Bala-Krishnan4,569     
|
|Richard Gosling7,607
||
|David Johnson14,897
|
|
|
|Lawrence Corp 231
|
|David Pengelly (F)253Mario Riberio (Ind)243Lee Wildgen (Ind)119
||
|David Johnson
|-
| style="background:whitesmoke;"|Downsview
|
|Anthony Perruzza8,782     
||
|Annamarie Castrilli9,142
|
|Frank Ellis4,444
|
|Tiina Leivo 217
|
|
|
|Donato De Dominicis (Ind)572
||
|Anthony Perruzza
|-
| style="background:whitesmoke;"|Lawrence  
|
|Donato Santeramo5,000   
||
|Joseph Cordiano11,784
|
|Emilia Valentini7,955
|
|Eric Saumur 246
|
|Roy Anderson 698
|
|
||
|Joseph Cordiano
|-
| style="background:whitesmoke;"|Oriole
|
|David Cox3,665     
||
|Elinor Caplan11,164
|
|Paul Sutherland10,130
|
|Don Roebuck 115
|
|Donna Anderson 227
|
|Bernadette Michael (Ind)243
||
|Elinor Caplan
|-
| style="background:whitesmoke;"|Willowdale
|
|Julie McCrea4,825
|
|Les Scheininger9,870
||
|Charles Harnick18,834
|
|Laura Weinberg 386
|
|Michael Beifuss 253
|
|Frank Zeppieri (Ind)715
||
|Charles Harnick
|-
| style="background:whitesmoke;"|Wilson Heights 
|
|Claudia White4,612    
||
|Monte Kwinter12,468
|
|Sam Pasternack9,772
|
|Tom Salsberg 303
|
|Mike Dubinsky 438
|
|Dan Largy (FCP)231David Yates (Ref)109
||
|Monte Kwinter
|-
| style="background:whitesmoke;"|York East    
|
|Gary Malkowski9,526
|
|Steve Mastoras7,398
||
|John Parker12,789
|
|
|
|Marilyn Pepper 243
|
|Steve Kotsopoulos (Ind)497John Richardson (Ind)251
||
|Gary Malkowski
|-
| style="background:whitesmoke;"|York Mills  
|
|Lesley Durham2,930  
|
|David MacNaughton7,318
||
|David Turnbull18,852
|
|Marion Wyse 157
|
|Debbie Weberg173
|
|Mark Meschino (Lbt)223
||
|David Turnbull
|-
| style="background:whitesmoke;"|Yorkview 
|
|Giorgio Mammoliti6,447   
||
|Mario Sergio9,245
|
|Danny Varaich3,989
|
|
|
|
|
|
||
|Giorgio Mammoliti
|}

Toronto

|-
| style="background:whitesmoke;"|Beaches—Woodbine
||
|Frances Lankin10,862
|
|Stephen Lautens6,158
|
|Lynda Buffet7,923
|
|
|
|Donalda Fredeen 162
|
|Brad Allen (Ind)319Miguel Figueroa (Comm)169
||
|Frances Lankin
|-
| style="background:whitesmoke;"|Dovercourt  
||
|Tony Silipo9,049   
|
|Maria Dasilva-Skultety5,561
|
|Malcolm Mansfield3,560
|
|Shelly Lipsey 390
|
|Erica Kindl 179
|
|Amani Oakley (Ind Labour)261Douglas Quinn (Lbt)161
||
|Tony Silipo
|-
| style="background:whitesmoke;"|Eglinton 
|
|Adam Di Carlo4,597    
|
|Dianne Poole12,904
||
|Bill Saunderson17,496
|
|Dan King 395
|
|Linda Martin 325
|
|Fernand Deschamps (Ind Renewal)123
||
|Dianne Poole
|-
| style="background:whitesmoke;"|Fort York     
||
|Rosario Marchese10,762
|
|Bob Wong8,482
|
|Jacob Joel6,025
|
|Kevin Ells 300
|
|Maurice Seguin 133
|
|Paul Barker (Lbt)266Matthew Shepherd (Ind)140John Steele (Comm League)129
||
|Rosario Marchese
|-
| style="background:whitesmoke;"|High Park—Swansea 
|
|Elaine Ziemba8,899    
|
|Ted Lojko7,121
||
|Derwyn Shea10,559
|
|David Burman 368
|
|Greg Roberts 286
|
|
||
|Elaine Ziemba
|-
| style="background:whitesmoke;"|Parkdale  
|
|Martin Silva5,795   
||
|Tony Ruprecht8,435
|
|Fred Blucher2,887
|
|Miriam Hawkins 363
|
|
|
|Wilfred Szczesny (Comm)142
||
|Tony Ruprecht
|-
| style="background:whitesmoke;"|Riverdale
||
|Marilyn Churley10,948     
|
|Frank Lowery5,443
|
|John Gamble6,348
|
|Marianna Tzabiras 217
|
|Loucas Café 124
|
|Pat Marquis (Ind)273
||
|Marilyn Churley
|-
| style="background:whitesmoke;"|St. Andrew—St. Patrick 
|
|David Jacobs9,231    
|
|Carolyn Bennett9,413
||
|Isabel Bassett13,092
|
|Hamish Wilson 271
|
|Bruce Hislop 237
|
|Mark Scott (Lbt)141
||
|Vacant
|-
| style="background:whitesmoke;"|St. George—St. David
|
|Brent Hawkes9,672     
|
|Tim Murphy10,325
||
|Al Leach10,662
|
|Chris Lea 241
|
|Ron Robins (NLP)151
|
|Linda Gibbons (Ind)326Alexander Nosal (Ind)98
||
|Tim Murphy
|}

Etobicoke and York

|-
| style="background:whitesmoke;"|Etobicoke—Humber 
|
|Osman Ali3,100    
|
|Jim Henderson13,634
||
|Doug Ford, Sr.18,128
|
|
|
|Lawrence Staranchuk 196
|
|Omar Mohamed (Ind)257Mohamoud Sheik-Nor (Ind)51
||
|Jim Henderson
|-
| style="background:whitesmoke;"|Etobicoke—Lakeshore   
|
|Ruth Grier8,279  
|
|Bruce Davis9,074
||
|Morley Kells14,879
|
|Daniel Hunt 270
|
|Geraldine Jackson 209
|
|Julie Northrup (Ind Renewal)186
||
|Ruth Grier
|-
| style="background:whitesmoke;"|Etobicoke—Rexdale 
|
|Ed Philip8,668    
|
|Lorraine Nowina7,173
||
|John Hastings9,521
|
|
|
|Miki Staranchuk 188
|
|Diane Johnston (Ind Renewal)488
||
|Ed Philip
|-
| style="background:whitesmoke;"|Etobicoke West    
|
|Judy Jones4,608 
|
|Michael Brown9,826
||
|Chris Stockwell18,349
|
|
|
|Laureen Amos399
|
|
||
|Chris Stockwell
|-
| style="background:whitesmoke;"|Oakwood
|
|Tony Rizzo7,624     
||
|Mike Colle8,599
|
|Courtney Doldron3,298
|
|Nunzio Venuto 100
|
|Doug Storey 135
|
|Joe Flexer (Ind Labour)301Constantine Kritsonis (G)269
||
|Tony Rizzo
|-
| style="background:whitesmoke;"|York South
||
|Bob Rae10,442     
|
|Hagood Hardy6,025
|
|Larry Edwards7,726
|
|Roma Kelembet (Lbt)153
|
|Bob Hyman (NLP)176
|
|Don Pennell (FCP)305David James Cooper (G)219Kevin Clarke (Ind)170Darrell Rankin (Comm)105 	
||
|Bob Rae
|}

Brampton, Mississauga and Halton

|-
| style="background:whitesmoke;"|Brampton North
|
|John Devries5,288     
|
|Carman McClelland14,800
||
|Joe Spina20,148
|
|Lester Newby (NLP)494
||
|Carman McClelland
|-
| style="background:whitesmoke;"|Brampton South 
|
|Paul Ledgister5,676    
|
|Bob Callahan15,237
||
|Tony Clement21,859
|
|Bernie Cissek (FCP)1,011Maxim Newby (NLP)229
||
|Bob Callahan
|-
| style="background:whitesmoke;"|Burlington South 
|
|David Miles3,507    
|
|Ray Rivers5,415
||
|Cam Jackson24,831
|
|Emidio Corvaro (FCP)470
||
|Cam Jackson
|-
| style="background:whitesmoke;"|Halton Centre
|
|Richard Banigan5,268
|
|Barbara Sullivan13,977
||
|Terence Young30,621
|
|
||
|Barbara Sullivan
|-
| style="background:whitesmoke;"|Halton North   
|
|Noel Duignan4,362  
|
|Walt Elliot6,568
||
|Ted Chudleigh19,247
|
|Alex McKee (FCP)1,239John Shadbolt (Lbt)461
||
|Noel Duignan
|-
| style="background:whitesmoke;"|Mississauga East 
|
|Zenia Wadhwani5,120    
|
|Konstantine Katsoulis10,039
||
|Carl DeFaria16,468
|
|
||
|John Sola
|-
| style="background:whitesmoke;"|Mississauga North
|
|Dan Shekhar5,283     
|
|Steve Offer17,681
||
|John Snobelen22,095
|
|John Boddy (G)1,206
||
|Steve Offer
|-
| style="background:whitesmoke;"|Mississauga South
|
|David Messenger3,282
|
|Ieva Martin5,551
||
|Margaret Marland23,116
|
|Scott Kay (NLP)334Adrian Crewson (Ind)309Wolfgang Mueller (Ind)287Matthew Wood (G)256
||
|Margaret Marland
|-
| style="background:whitesmoke;"|Mississauga West
|
|Paul Daniel6,758     
|
|Steve Mahoney23,275
||
|Rob Sampson26,614

|
|George Meekins (CoR)952
||
|Steve Mahoney
|-
| style="background:whitesmoke;"|Oakville South
|
|Willie Lambert2,973     
|
|Lou Rocca8,479
||
|Gary Carr21,689

|
|Mike Rooney (FCP)1,103
||
|Gary Carr
|}

Hamilton-Wentworth and Niagara

|-
| style="background:whitesmoke;"|Hamilton Centre 
||
|David Christopherson8,012    
|
|Filomena Tassi7,322
|
|Angie Tomasic5,723
|
|Tom Wigglesworth 376
|
|Monique Poudrette 331
|
|
||
|David Christopherson
|-
| style="background:whitesmoke;"|Hamilton East 
|
|Andrew Mackenzie7,042    
||
|Dominic Agostino11,088
|
|Don Sheppard6,263
|
|Angela Corvaro 681
|
|
|
|Bob Mann (Comm)389
||
|Robert W. Mackenzie
|-
| style="background:whitesmoke;"|Hamilton Mountain 
|
|Brian Charlton9,817    
|
|Marie Bountrogianni12,824
||
|Trevor Pettit13,852
|
|Michael O'Grady 1,329
|
|
|
|
||
|Brian Charlton
|-
| style="background:whitesmoke;"|Hamilton West   
|
|Richard Allen9,267  
|
|Helen Wilson8,911
||
|Lillian Ross13,301
|
|Lynne Scime 880
|
|Rita Rassenberg 284
|
|Hans Wienhold (Lbt)169
||
|Richard Allen
|-
| style="background:whitesmoke;"|Lincoln
|
|Ron Hansen5,800     
|
|Harry Pelissero10,876
||
|Frank Sheehan18,709
|
|Tristan Emmanuel 1,241
|
|Mary Glasser 288
|
|
||
|Ron Hansen
|-
| style="background:whitesmoke;"|Niagara Falls 
|
|Margaret Harrington7,034    
|
|Marg Germano8,289
||
|Bart Maves12,132
|
|
|
|Bill Amos 355
|
|Melania Gural (Ind)189
||
|Margaret Harrington
|-
| style="background:whitesmoke;"|Niagara South
|
|Shirley Coppen5,376     
|
|Aubrey Foley7,634
||
|Tim Hudak8,815
|
|Al Kiers 536
|
|
|
|Morton Sider (Ind)688
||
|Shirley Coppen
|-
| style="background:whitesmoke;"|St. Catharines
|
|Jeff Burch3,929     
||
|Jim Bradley13,761
|
|Archie Heide11,486
|
|Jon Siemens 245
|
|Marcy Sheremetta 153
|
|
||
|Jim Bradley
|-
| style="background:whitesmoke;"|St. Catharines—Brock  
|
|Christel Haeck5,521   
|
|Gail Richardson7,373
||
|Tom Froese11,976
|
|Bert Pynenburg 598
|
|
|
|
||
|Christel Haeck
|-
| style="background:whitesmoke;"|Welland—Thorold 
||
|Peter Kormos12,848    
|
|Bob Muir8,630
|
|Greg Reid8,089
|
|
|
|Helene Ann Darisse 232
|
|Barry Fitzgerald (F)285
||
|Peter Kormos
|-
| style="background:whitesmoke;"|Wentworth East  
|
|Mark Morrow6,667   
|
|Shirley Collins12,282
||
|Ed Doyle15,888
|
|
|
|
|
|Mark Davies (Ind)863
||
|Mark Morrow
|-
| style="background:whitesmoke;"|Wentworth North
|
|Don Abel6,474     
|
|Chris Ward10,393
||
|Toni Skarica21,165
|
|
|
|
|
|
||
|Don Abel
|}

Midwestern Ontario

|-
| style="background:whitesmoke;"|Brantford
|
|Brad Ward8,165     
|
|Dave Neumann10,418
||
|Ron Johnson13,745
|
|Paul Vandervet 762
|
|William Darfler (G)430
||
|Brad Ward
|-
| style="background:whitesmoke;"|Brant—Haldimand  
|
|Willem Hanrath3,030   
|
|Ronald Eddy10,589
||
|Peter Preston14,184
|
|Steve Elgersma 1,340
|
|Terry Childs (G)527
||
|Ronald Eddy
|-
| style="background:whitesmoke;"|Cambridge  
|
|Mike Farnan11,797   
|
|Ben Tucci5,606
||
|Gerry Martiniuk17,269
|
|Al Smith 1,690
|
|Reg Gervais (Ind)433
||
|Mike Farnan
|-
| style="background:whitesmoke;"|Guelph  
|
|Derek Fletcher10,278   
|
|Rick Ferraro11,459
||
|Brenda Elliott17,204
|
|John Gots 1,035
|
|Thomas Bradburn (Lbt)265Anna Di Carlo (Ind Renewal)187
||
|Derek Fletcher
|-
| style="background:whitesmoke;"|Huron 
|
|Paul Klopp6,927    
|
|John Jewitt7,009
||
|Helen Johns13,343
|
|Phil Cornish 1,418
|
|Kimble Ainslie (Ref)207
||
|Paul Klopp
|-
| style="background:whitesmoke;"|Kitchener 
|
|Sandi Ellis6,998    
|
|Bryan Stortz9,992
||
|Wayne Wettlaufer13,374
|
|Lou Reitzel 2,111
|
|Bob Oberholtzer (Ind)612Frank Kerek (Ind)223
||
|Vacant
|-
| style="background:whitesmoke;"|Kitchener—Wilmot     
|
|Mike Cooper8,146
|
|Shelly Schlueter10,106
||
|Gary Leadston17,392
|
|Ted Kryn 2,415
|
|
||
|Mike Cooper
|-
| style="background:whitesmoke;"|Norfolk
|
|Norm Jamison7,893    
|
|Rudy Stickl9,413
||
|Toby Barrett17,335
|
|Andre De Decker 972
|
|
||
|Norm Jamison
|-
| style="background:whitesmoke;"|Oxford
|
|Kimble Sutherland9,501     
|
|Bruce Sibbick6,564
||
|Ernie Hardeman17,568
|
|Case Van Blyderveen 1,061
|
|Kaye Sargent (Lbt)386Jim Morris (NLP)275Jim Montag (F)148
||
|Kimble Sutherland
|-
| style="background:whitesmoke;"|Perth
|
|Karen Haslam8,445     
|
|Gerry Teahen7,722
||
|Bert Johnson13,735
|
|
|
|Robert Smink (F)427Patrick Van Galen (Ind)326
||
|Karen Haslam
|-
| style="background:whitesmoke;"|Waterloo North
|
|Hugh Miller6,869     
|
|Bob Byron8,729
||
|Elizabeth Witmer25,757
|
|Sandra Kryn 1,714
|
|Blaine Watson (NLP)275
||
|Elizabeth Witmer
|-
| style="background:whitesmoke;"|Wellington 
|
|Elaine Rogala4,104   
|
|Don Ross5,706
||
|Ted Arnott21,573
|
|John Meenan 782
|
|Dianne Sanderson (Lbt)269
||
|Ted Arnott
|}

Southwestern Ontario

|-
| style="background:whitesmoke;"|Chatham—Kent
|
|Randy Hope7,444   
| 
|Mike Ferguson9,915
||
|Jack Carroll10,461
|
|David Edwards 1,008
|
|
|
|
||
|Randy Hope
|- 
|style="background:whitesmoke;"|Elgin  
|
|Hugh MacGinnis3,445 
|
|Barry Fitzgerald5,801
| 
|Jim Williams10,660
|
|
|
|
||
|Peter North (Ind.)12,436Ray Monteith (F)565
||
|Peter North
|- 
| style="background:whitesmoke;"|Essex-Kent
|
|Pat Hayes7,837   
||
|Pat Hoy10,130
|
|George Kennedy8,384
|
|Steve Posthumus 1,022
|
|
|
|
||
|Pat Hayes
|- 
| style="background:whitesmoke;"|Essex South 
|
|Dave Maris4,348  
|| 
|Bruce Crozier14,513
|
|Dave Wylupek5,730
|
|Joyce Cherry 1,550
|
|David Mitchell 498
|
|
||
|Bruce Crozier
|- 
| style="background:whitesmoke;"|Lambton
|
|Dona Stewardson5,055   
| 
|Larry O'Neill7,925
||
|Marcel Beaubien12,034
|
|Jim Hopper 2,184
|
|
|
|Wayne Forbes (F)417
||
|Ellen MacKinnon
|-
| style="background:whitesmoke;"|London Centre 
||
|Marion Boyd11,096  
| 
|Ron Postian7,559
|
|Patrick McGuinness9,364
|
|Mike Dwyer 1,041
|
|Liz Overall 134
|
|Jeff Culbert (G)533Lloyd Walker (F)452
||
|Marion Boyd
|-
| style="background:whitesmoke;"|London North  
|
|Carolyn Davies8,167 
| 
|Larry Crossan11,112
||
|Dianne Cunningham23,195
|
|Graeme Benedetti 777
|
|Rita Varrin 101
|
|John Beverley (G)365Jack Plant (F)334
||
|Dianne Cunningham
|-
| style="background:whitesmoke;"|London South
|
|David Winninger10,729   
| 
|Joan Smith10,693
||
|Bob Wood18,161
|
|Rudy Polci 387
|
|James Hea 111
|
|Maureen Battaglia (F)340Mark Simpson (Ref)323Sven Biggs (G)202
||
|David Winninger
|-
| style="background:whitesmoke;"|Middlesex
|
|Irene Mathyssen8,799   
| 
|Doug Reycraft10,448
||
|Bruce Smith15,684
|
|Jamie Harris 3,481
|
|
|
|Barry Malcolm (F)458
||
|Irene Mathyssen
|-
| style="background:whitesmoke;"|Sarnia   
|
|Bob Huget7,487
| 
|Joan Link8,626
||
|David Boushy9,260
|
|Ron Raes 1,642
|
|
|
|Anthony Barbato (Ind)217Andrew Falby (Ind)159
||
|Bob Huget
|-
| style="background:whitesmoke;"|Windsor—Riverside 
||
|Dave Cooke12,347 
| 
|Gary McNamara9,412
|
|Blaine Tyndall4,440
|
|Michel Ozorak 459
|
|Sherry Lanier 362
|
|
||
|Dave Cooke
|-
| style="background:whitesmoke;"|Windsor—Sandwich
|
|Arlene Rousseau6,414   
||
|Sandra Pupatello11,940
|
|Joe Durocher5,704
|
|Earl Amyotte 610
|
|Ronald Bessette 263
|
|Christine Wilson (Ind)410
||
|George Dadamo
|-
| style="background:whitesmoke;"|Windsor—Walkerville 
|
|Wayne Lessard9,901  
||
|Dwight Duncan10,281
|
|Michael Rohrer3,610
|
|Donna Halliday 957
|
|Vivek Narula 156
|
|
||
|Wayne Lessard
|}

Northeastern Ontario

|-
| style="background:whitesmoke;"|Algoma
||
|Bud Wildman6,190
| 
|Paula Dunning3,128
|
|Phil Sabine4,602
|
|
||
|Bud Wildman
|- 
| style="background:whitesmoke;"|Algoma—Manitoulin 
|
|Lois Miller2,991  
|| 
|Mike Brown7,238
|
|Joyce Foster5,184

|
|
||
|Mike Brown
|-
| style="background:whitesmoke;"|Cochrane North
||
|Len Wood6,935
| 
|Gilles Gagnon4,952
|
|Louis Veilleux3,316
|
|
||
|Len Wood
|-
| style="background:whitesmoke;"|Cochrane South 
||
|Gilles Bisson12,114 
| 
|Jim Brown4,958
|
|Gord Miller6,587
|
|Joel Vien (Ind)339
||
|Gilles Bisson
|-
| style="background:whitesmoke;"|Nickel Belt
||
|Floyd Laughren8,007   
| 
|Betty Rheaume5,549
|
|Frank Deburger3,305

|
|Michel Chartrand (Ind)225Grace Tancock (NLP)119
||
|Floyd Laughren
|-
| style="background:whitesmoke;"|Nipissing 
|
|Doug Bennett4,350  
| 
|Bert Brandon7,885
||
|Mike Harris18,722
|
|
||
|Mike Harris
|-
| style="background:whitesmoke;"|Parry Sound 
|
|Dan Reed3,367  
| 
|Mark Fisher4,821
||
|Ernie Eves15,523
|
|
||
|Ernie Eves
|-
| style="background:whitesmoke;"|Sault Ste. Marie
||
|Tony Martin15,392   
| 
|Carmen Provenzano11,672
|
|Lou Turco7,699
|
|Paul Thompson (G)757
||
|Tony Martin
|-
| style="background:whitesmoke;"|Sudbury  
|
|Sharon Murdock8,698 
||
|Rick Bartolucci12,349
|
|Richard Zanibbi8,093
|
|Don Scott (Ind)506David Gordon (NL)315Lewis Poulin (G)290Ed Pokonzie (Ind)123
||
|Sharon Murdock
|-
| style="background:whitesmoke;"|Sudbury East   
||
|Shelley Martel11,236
| 
|Paul Menard9,594
|
|Don Mark8,680
|
|Guy Martin (Ind)473William Morrison (NLP)310
||
|Shelley Martel
|-
| style="background:whitesmoke;"|Timiskaming
|
|Ambrose Raftis2,962   
|| 
|David Ramsay8,643
|
|Ian MacPherson6,185
|
|Ralph Schaffner (CoR)685
||
|David Ramsay 
|}

Northwestern Ontario

|-
| style="background:whitesmoke;"|Fort William
|
|Greg Laws4,561   
|| 
|Lyn McLeod15,681
|
|Evelyn Dodds7,116
|
|
||
|Lyn McLeod
|- 
| style="background:whitesmoke;"|Kenora   
|
|Mike Clancy2,788
|| 
|Frank Miclash9,152
|
|Gord Griffiths5,097
|
|
||
|Frank Miclash
|- 
| style="background:whitesmoke;"|Lake Nipigon
||
|Gilles Pouliot5,079   
| 
|Ian MacQuarrie3,463
|
|Vic Fournel3,273
|
|
||
|Gilles Pouliot
|- 
| style="background:whitesmoke;"|Port Arthur  
|
|Shelley Wark-Martyn7,490 
||
|Michael Gravelle14,281
|
|Jim Doherty6,554
|
|Anita Harris (FCP)683Paul Weber (Ind)182
||
|Shelley Wark-Martyn
|- 
| style="background:whitesmoke;"|Rainy River   
||
|Howard Hampton4,912
| 
|Darren Brown2,683
|
|Lynn Beyak4,707
|
|
||
|Howard Hampton
|}

Byelections
Due to resignations, five by-elections were held between the 1995 and 1999 elections.

|-
| style="background:whitesmoke;"|York SouthMay 23, 1996
||
|Gerard Kennedy7,774
|
|Rob Davis5,093
|
|David Miller6,656
|
|David Milne (Ind)151George Dance (Lbt)77Kevin Clarke (Ind)70
||
|Bob Raeresigned February 29, 1996
|- 
| style="background:whitesmoke;"|OrioleSeptember 4, 1997
|| 
|David Caplan9,954
|
|Barbara Greene5,163
|
|Jim Kafieh1,700
|
|Bernadette Michael (Ind)132Shelly Lipsey (G)96
||
|Elinor Caplanresigned May 5, 1997
|- 
| style="background:whitesmoke;"|Ottawa WestSeptember 4, 1997
| |
| Alex Cullen11,438
|
| Chris Thompson7,217
|
| Katrina Prystupa2,573
|
|John Turmel (Ind)201Gene Villeneuve (G)96
||
|Bob Chiarelliresigned May 5, 1997
|- 
| style="background:whitesmoke;"|Windsor—RiversideSeptember 4, 1997
|
|Gary McNamara8,494
|
|Fran Funero3,028
||
|Wayne Lessard9,308
|
|Steve Harvey (G)329
||
|Dave Cookeresigned May 5, 1997
|- 
| style="background:whitesmoke;"|Nickel BeltOctober 1, 1998  
| 
|Frank Madigan4,173
|
|Gerry Courtemanche3,836
||
|Blain Morin5,537
|
|
||
|Floyd Laughrenresigned February 28, 1998
|}

See also
Politics of Ontario
List of Ontario political parties
Premier of Ontario
Leader of the Opposition (Ontario)

References

1995 elections in Canada
1995 in Ontario
1995
June 1995 events in Canada